The 2010 WPA World Eight-ball Championship was an eight-ball world championship, organized by the World Pool-Billiard Association (WPA), and held 4–10 April 2010 at the Fujairah Exhibition Centre of the Al Diar Siji Hotel in Fujairah, United Arab Emirates. A total of 64 players competed in the tournament.

The event was won by Englishman Karl Boyes, who defeated Niels Feijen in the final 13–12.

Tournament summary
The event was split into two sections, a double elimination round, splitting the field from 64 to 32, and then a traditional knockout round. In this round, former two time 9-Ball world champion Thorsten Hohmann lost to  8–7, thanks to a miscue in the final rack.

Mika Immonen lost in the round of 32 to Ruslan Chinachov. Chinachov would make it to the semi-finals where he would lose to Karl Boyes, whilst Feijen would overcome Darren Appleton.

In the final, Boyes had the much better start and led Fiejen 4-0 and 11–5, before his opponent started a catch-up and levelled at 12-12. Boyes won the final rack, winning 13–12.

Tournament bracket

References

External links
event at AZbilliards.com
Official World 8-ball Championship website

WPA World Eight-ball Championship
WPA World Eight-ball Championship
WPA World Eight-ball Championship
International sports competitions hosted by the United Arab Emirates